State Highway 122 (RJ SH 122, SH-122) is a State Highway in Rajasthan state of India that connects Baroni in Tonk district of Rajasthan with Kurgaon in Karauli district of Rajasthan. The total length of RJ SH 122 is 158 km.

State Highway 122 has been made by upgrading Major District Road 111. This highway connects NH 52 in Baroni to NH 23 in Kurgaon.

Route 
SH122 connects Shiwar, Sarsop, Encher and Sawai Madhopur in the state of Rajasthan.

Junctions 

  Terminal near Baroni.
  near Sawai Madhopur.
  Terminal near Kurgaon.

References

External links

Tonk district
Sawai Madhopur district
Karauli district
State Highways in Rajasthan